Murlene Johnson Randle (born March 31, 1952) is a judge of the San Francisco County Superior Court since 2020. She is the former Director of the Office of Criminal Justice for San Francisco and a Discrimination Attorney.

Education
She graduated with a Bachelor of Science in Business Education from Jackson State University in 1973 and a Juris Doctor from Santa Clara University School of Law in 1980.

Legal career
From 1996 to 2004 she was employed at the San Francisco District Attorney's Office where she served as Chief of the Sexual Assault and Child Abuse Units from 1996 to 1997, Chief Prosecutor of the Homicide Unit from 1997 to 2001, Chief of the Criminal Division from 2001 to 2003, and Chief Assistant District Attorney from 2003 to 2004.

In January 2004 she was appointed by Mayor Gavin Newsom to serve as the Director of the Mayor’s Office of Criminal Justice and served in that position until January 2006.

From January to August 2006 she was a Chief Labor Negotiator for the San Francisco Department of Human Resources.

From 2006 to 2020 she owned her own law firm and practiced law in San Francisco.

On November 13, 2020, Governor Gavin Newsom appointed Randle to be a judge of the San Francisco County Superior Court to fill the vacancy left by the elevation of Judge Teri L. Jackson to the California Courts of Appeal.

See also 
 List of African-American jurists

References

External links
Law Offices of Murlene J. Randle - San Francisco Employment Discrimination Lawyer

1952 births
Living people
20th-century American lawyers
20th-century American women lawyers
21st-century American judges
21st-century American lawyers
21st-century American women lawyers
African-American judges
African-American lawyers
California lawyers
California state court judges
Jackson State University alumni
People from Greenwood, Mississippi
People from San Francisco
Santa Clara University School of Law alumni
Superior court judges in the United States
20th-century African-American women
20th-century African-American people
21st-century African-American women
21st-century African-American people